The Man Without a Conscience is a 1925 American silent drama film directed by James Flood and written by Louis D. Lighton and Hope Loring. The film stars Willard Louis, Irene Rich, June Marlowe, John Patrick, Robert Agnew, and Helen Dunbar. The film was released by Warner Bros. on June 7, 1925.

Plot
As described in a film magazine review, Amos Mason ruthlessly takes the savings of his fiancée Ann Sherman and then casts her aside when he succeeds in his scheme in New York City to make a fortune rapidly. He causes Ann to be discharged when she finds a position with the Graves family. Amos becomes involved in a real estate business which grows quickly. He employs James Warren to build his mansion. James has married Ann, who tells her husband of the trickery of Amos. Amos and Shirley Graves have married, and a child is born to them. However, Shirley does not love Amos, and cares instead for Douglas White. After the child is born, Amos' trickery is found out and he is sent to prison. There he repents, and after he is released he returns to his wife who is waiting for him with more affection than before.

Cast
Willard Louis as Amos Mason
Irene Rich as Shirley Graves
June Marlowe as Ann Sherman
John Patrick as Douglas White
Robert Agnew as James Warren
Helen Dunbar as Mrs. Graves
Kate Price as Mrs. McBride

References

External links
 

1925 films
1920s English-language films
Silent American drama films
1925 drama films
Warner Bros. films
Films directed by James Flood
American silent feature films
American black-and-white films
1920s American films